Naiomi Glasses is an American (Diné) textile artist and skateboarder who uses social media to represent indigenous culture.

Early life 
Glasses was bullied as a child due to bilateral cleft lip and cleft palate. Glasses' older brother taught her how to skateboard at the age of 5.

Career 
Using social media Glasses has advocated for the construction of a skate park in Two Grey Hills, Newcomb, New Mexico. She features traditional Diné fashion in her skateboarding TikToks. 

Glasses raises sheep for wool used in her weaved rugs and purses. 

Glasses uses social media to share and represent indigenous culture.

Glasses is a turquoise collector.

Personal life 
Glasses is from Rock Point, Arizona.

References

External links

Living people
Year of birth missing (living people)
People from Apache County, Arizona
Navajo artists
Native American women artists
Native American textile artists
21st-century women textile artists
21st-century textile artists
American weavers
21st-century American women artists
Native American skateboarders
Navajo sportspeople
Female skateboarders
Sportspeople from Arizona
Artists from Arizona
21st-century Native American women
21st-century Native Americans